The Milnerton Lighthouse, commissioned on 1960-03-10, is located on Table Bay shore in Milnerton, South Africa. Its red sector covers Robben Island.

See also

 List of lighthouses in South Africa

References

External links

Milnerton Light, Lighthouse Depot
Milnerton, Lighthouses of South Africa
 

Lighthouses completed in 1960
Lighthouses in South Africa
Buildings and structures in Cape Town